Eggenburg is a town in the district of Horn in Lower Austria, Austria.

Population

People 
 Johann Zelebor (1819–1869), naturalist, illustrator, and zoologist
 Maria Teschler-Nicola (b. 1950), human biologist, anthropologist and ethnologist
 Karl-Heinz Lehner, operatic bass-baritone

References

External links

Cities and towns in Horn District